Chongru She Ethnic Township (崇儒畲族乡) is an ethnic township in Xiapu County.

Located in Fujian Sheng province, in the southeastern part of the country, 1,500 km south of Beijing is the capital of the country. 247 meters above sea level is located in Chongru, and has 2,800 inhabitants.

The land around Chongru is hilly. The highest point in the vicinity has an elevation of 562 meters and is 2.0 km west of Chongru. There are about 214 people per square kilometer around Chongru relatively sparsely populated. The nearest larger town is Songcheng, 10.7 km southeast of Chongru. The area around Chongru is almost covered with dust and barrenness. In the region around Chongru, lakes are remarkably common.

The climate is subtropical. The average temperature is 18 ° C. The warmest month is July, at 24 ° C, and the coldest January, at 10 ° C. The average rainfall is 2,105 millimeters per year. The wettest month is August, with 322 millimeters of rain, and the wettest October, with 52 millimeters.

Notes

References 

Township-level divisions of Fujian